Chloroethylnorapomorphine is a chemical once thought to be an irreversible dopamine D2 receptor antagonist; however, it was later proved to be reversible.

References

Catechols
Organochlorides
Dibenzoquinolines